, 47 places are heritage-listed in the Shire of Three Springs, of which one is on the State Register of Heritage Places, which is maintained by the Heritage Council of Western Australia.

List

State Register of Heritage Places
The Western Australian State Register of Heritage Places, lists the following state registered place within the Shire of Three Springs:

Shire of Three Springs heritage-listed places
The following places are heritage listed in the Shire of Three Springs but are not State registered:

References

Three
State Register of Heritage Places in the Mid West (Western Australia)
Shire of Three Springs